Damian Piotr Johansson (born 28 February 1995) is a Swedish professional footballer who plays as a defender for Djurgårdens IF.

Club career
On 10 July 2014 Johansson signed a first team contract on a youth basis with Malmö FF. He had previously made his first team debut in a friendly game against FK Partizan on 27 June 2014 in Belgrade. Johansson made his Allsvenskan debut in a home match against Åtvidabergs FF on 12 July 2014. Johansson went to Superettan side Ängelholms FF on a loan deal on 20 March 2015 for the duration of the season.

International career 
Johansson represented the Sweden U17 team a total of 17 times between 2010 and 2012, scoring two goals.

Personal life 
Johansson was born in Gorlice, Poland and is of Swedish and Polish descent.

Career statistics
As of 23 April 2022.

Honours
;Malmö FF
 Allsvenskan: 2014, 2016

References

External links
 Malmö FF profile 
 
 

1995 births
Living people
Swedish footballers
Sweden youth international footballers
Swedish people of Polish descent
Polish people of Swedish descent
Footballers from Skåne County
Malmö FF players
Ängelholms FF players
Gefle IF players
Kalmar FF players
Djurgårdens IF Fotboll players
Allsvenskan players
Superettan players
Polish emigrants to Sweden
Naturalized citizens of Sweden
Association football wingers